"I'm Just a Kid" is the debut single by Canadian pop punk band Simple Plan, written by Pierre Bouvier. It appeared on their debut album No Pads, No Helmets...Just Balls. It was featured in the films Grind, The New Guy, and Cheaper by the Dozen.

The song saw a resurgence in popularity in April 2020 on the social media platform TikTok, where the song was used in a challenge that involves family members re-creating childhood photos.

Track listing
 "I'm Just a Kid (Single Version)"
 "One By One"
 "Grow Up"

Music video
The music video is about how an awkward, average guy (DJ Qualls) attempts to impress a popular girl (Eliza Dushku) by attempting to perform dangerous stunts, but other, more popular boys interrupt to take his place. They fail to succeed and are injured, and the main characters look on with pained expressions of pity and a certain amount of schadenfreude. Ending with the average guy simply speaking to the girl and her walking off with him while the heavily injured popular boys watch in disbelief. There is also a surreal sequence, in which the archetypal popular boy, played by rhythm guitarist and backing vocalist Sébastien Lefebvre, is hit by a school bus. The video was made with actors from the movie The New Guy, such as Qualls and Tony Hawk. As such, it was released as an extra on the DVD and VHS of The New Guy. As well, in the video, there is a clip of Hawk taken from the final football game in the movie. Most of the scenes in the video were filmed at Long Beach Polytechnic High School in Long Beach, California.

Jesse Heiman appears as a nerd.

Chart performance
The song peaked at number 64 on the Canadian Hot 100.

Certifications

References

Simple Plan songs
2001 songs
2002 debut singles
Atlantic Records singles
Songs written by Pierre Bouvier
Songs written by Chuck Comeau
Songs written by Arnold Lanni
Songs written by Sébastien Lefebvre
Songs written by Jeff Stinco
Songs about children
Songs about loneliness